Kagutsuchi (カグツチ; Old Japanese: Kagututi), also known as Hi-no-Kagutsuchi or Homusubi among other names, is the kami of fire in classical Japanese mythology.

Mythology
Kagutsuchi's birth burned his mother Izanami, causing her death. His father Izanagi, in his grief, beheaded Kagutsuchi with his sword, Ame no Ohabari (天之尾羽張), and cut his body into eight pieces, which became eight volcanoes.  Kagutsuchi’s corpse created numerous deities, which typically includes Watatsumi, Kuraokami, Takemikazuchi, Futsunushi, Amatsumikaboshi, and  Ōyamatsumi.

Kagutsuchi's birth, in Japanese mythology, comes at the end of the creation of the world and marks the beginning of death.  In the Engishiki, a source which contains the myth, Izanami, in her death throes, bears the water god Mizuhanome, instructing her to pacify Kagu-tsuchi if he should become violent. This story also contains references to traditional fire-fighting tools: gourds for carrying water and wet clay and water reeds for smothering fires.

Name
The name Kagutsuchi was originally a compound phrase, consisting of kagu, an Old Japanese root verb meaning "to shine"; tsu, the Old Japanese possessive particle; and chi, an Old Japanese root meaning "force, power".

Worship
Kagutsuchi is the patron deity of blacksmiths and ceramic workers. He is worshipped in several shrines, one of which is Atago Shrine, near Kyoto.

Popular culture

 In the manga and anime Sailor Moon, a character named Hino Rei uses flame magic. 
 In the manga and anime Fairy Tail, a character named Zancrow uses the Flame God Slayer Magic and has an attack named after Kagutsuchi.
 In the manga Noragami, Kagutsuchi appears during the subjugation of Bishamon and is shown to be capable of blowing fire.
 In the anime Mai-HiME, Mai's Child is based upon Kagutsuchi.
 In the manga and anime Naruto: Shippuden, one of the main characters, Sasuke Uchiha, is shown to have the ability to manipulate the black flames of Amaterasu into various weapons. This is referred to as Blaze Release: Kagutsuchi, which refers to the fire god.
 In the anime Ao No Exorcist, the hometown to several of the characters is Kyoto, where a powerful sword was made from long ago by, and had to do with Kagu-Tsuchi.
 In the video game series BlazBlue, the main setting of the first two games is the 13th Hierarchical City of Kagutsuchi.
 In the same video game series, one of the playable characters, Nine the Phantom, has Hi no Kagutsuchi, an enormous fire elemental that can be summoned by her.
 In the video game series Brave Frontier, Kagatsuchi is a fire-based battle unit. He's in the form of a centaur, and is described as "a disastrous beast."
 In the manga Rurouni Kenshin, the main antagonist of the Kyoto Arc, Shishio Makoto, uses a technique called "The Final Secret Sword: Kagutsuchi" as a last resort "trump card", bringing down a cyclone of flames that his sword can produce at his enemy.
 In the Shin Megami Tensei and Persona franchises, Kagutsuchi is a recurring figure in various titles. In some he is a regular demon to be recruited, a sword bearing his name in reference to the novels the franchises are based on, and in others he is a central figure to the plot.
 In the video game Call of Duty: Black Ops II, a fire-elemental staff known as "Kagutsuchi's Blood" can be obtained on the Zombies map "Origins".
 In the mobile phone game Puzzle and Dragons, developed by Gung-ho, Hino Kagutsuchi is a collectible fire monster.
 In the card game Yu-Gi-Oh!, alongside Susanoo, Amaterasu, and Tsukuyomi, Kagutsuchi is one of the 4 Xyz Monsters of Bujin.
 In the mobile game Monster Strike, Kagutsuchi is a fire collectible, along with Susano'o, Amaterasu, Inari, Izanami, Izanagi and more.
 In the mobile game Dragalia Lost, Kagutsuchi appears as a red Flame-type dragon with golden armor fused to his body, given the title of ‘Incandescent General’. He is described as the rival of the game’s similarly-dragonized version of Marishi-Ten, with the two of them inadvertently creating a magical hot spring in the Hogo region of Hinomoto, the game’s version of Japan, during one of their duels, when Marishiten caused Kagutsuchi’s molten blood to seep into the spring’s water, permanently heating it and leading the locals to dub it the Bloodspring or Twin-Wyrm Spring in honor of the dragons’ eventual friendship. When Kagutsuchi isn’t waging war, he’s usually basking in a hot spring or frying chicken, which he offers to his allies.
In the manga and anime Gintama, the main weapon aboard the Altana Liberation Army's flag ship Amenotorifune, intended to destroy the Earth, is called "Hinokagutsuchi".
 In the video game Ghost of Tsushima, there is a Charm of Kagu-Tsuchi. This charm is granted by finding and honoring the Plum Blossom Shrine.
 In the light novel High School DxD: Slash/Dog series, Kagu-tsuchi is the Shinto God of Fire and also the patron deity of the Himejima Clan whom in turned blessed them with the power of spiritual flames. A descendant of the Himejima, Tobio Ikuse is the wielder of the Ame no Ohabari, the divine sword which killed Kagu-tsuchi which is infused with Kagu-tsuchi's divine flames which grant it immense power to kill even a Demon Lord Gressil.
 In the video game series The Alchemist Code, the royal family of Wadatsumi, Rising Ashes, which consists of Mitsuha, Kagura, Zeke Crowley and Logi Crowley, uses a fire ability called Kagutsuchi, which takes the form of a phoenix when used. This technique is very powerful against a type of enemy, ogres. In difficult situations, Mitsuha, Kagura and Logi use an advanced form of the fire technique, called "Kagutsuchi Kiraboshi".

See also 
 Kōjin
 Takemikazuchi
 Akiha Gongen
 List of fire gods
  part of the tymology of Homusubi

Notes

References
Ashkenazy, Michael. Handbook of Japanese Mythology. Santa Barbara, California: ABC-Clio, 2003.
Bock, Felicia G., trans. Engi-shiki: Procedures of the Engi Era.  ASU Center for Asian Studies (Occasional Paper #17).

External links
Kagutsuchi, Encyclopedia of Shinto
Kagutsuchi on the Japanese History Database.

Crafts gods
Fire gods
Japanese gods
Shinto kami
Smithing gods
Killed deities
Kunitsukami